Huang Kezhi (21 July 1927 – 6 December 2022) was a Chinese physicist who was a professor at Tsinghua University, and an academician of the Chinese Academy of Sciences.

Biography
Huang was born in Nanchang, Jiangxi, on 21 July 1927, to Huang Yicheng, a post office clerk, and Gong Shenxiu. His ancestral home is in Fuzhou, Fujian. His great-grandfather Huang Nailin was a traditional Chinese medical doctor. His grandfather Huang Xie was teacher. Due to the Japanese War of Aggression Against China, he successively attended Beitan Primary School, Baihuazhou Primary School, Tengwangge Primary School, Ji'an Yangming Middle School, and Jiangxi Provincial High School. After graduating in 1947, he became an assistant at Peiyang University. In October 1955, he was sent to study at Moscow State University on government scholarships. 

In September 1958, Huang was summoned to Tsinghua University for establishing the Department of Engineering Mechanics and Mathematics. In 1966, the Cultural Revolution broke out, Huang was labeled as a "reactionary academic authority" by the Communist government and was sent to the May Seventh Cadre Schools to do farm works in the suburb of Nanchang, Jiangxi. He was promoted to associate professor in 1963 and to full professor in 1978. He was appointed director of the Institute of Engineering Mechanics in 1983. 

On 6 December 2022, Huang died of an illness in Beijing, at the age of 95.

Personal life 
In 1955, Huang married Chen Peiying, a classmate of Tsinghua University from Zhejiang. The couple had three children: Qiong Huang (doctorate from Massachusetts Institute of Technology), Yonggang Huang, and Yongqiang Huang (doctorate from Stanford University).

Honours and awards
 1991 Member of the Chinese Academy of Sciences (CAS) 
 2001 Science and Technology Progress Award of the Ho Leung Ho Lee Foundation
 2003 Foreign Academician of the Russian Academy of Sciences (RAS)
 2004 State Natural Science Award (Second Class) for the study on the Theory of Tensor Function Representation and the Invariance of Material Constitutive Equation
 2005 State Natural Science Award (Second Class) for mechanical and electrical coupling failure and constitutive relation of ferroelectric ceramics
 2010 State Natural Science Award (Second Class) for deformation and fracture of electromagnetic solids

References

1927 births
2022 deaths
People from Nanchang
Physicists from Jiangxi
National Chung Cheng University alumni
Tsinghua University alumni
Academic staff of Tsinghua University
Members of the Chinese Academy of Sciences
Foreign Members of the Russian Academy of Sciences